Sangone may refer to:
Sangone, the name of a turtle of divine origin featuring in Tongan myths
Sangone (torrent), a river in Piedmont, Italy
Val Sangone, a valley in Piedmont, Italy